Huanghuacheng is a village in the town of Jiuduhe, in the Huairou District of northern Beijing.

Lakeside Great Wall

The village is home to a tourist section of the Great Wall officially called the Lakeside Great Wall. The section derives its name from the man-made reservoir lakes at the location in close proximity to the Great Wall. Unlike the main tourist sections of the Great Wall at Mutianyu and Badaling, the Lakeside Great Wall only usually draws in a handful of tourists. The section features appealing sights including submerged parts of the Great Wall under the lake water and the view after a steep hike to a high guard tower.

See also
 List of villages in China

References

External links
 Illustrated Atlas of Shanhai, Yongping, Jizhou, Miyun, Gubeikou, Huanghua Zhen and Other Areas

Huairou District
Villages in China
Great Wall of China
Buildings and structures in Beijing